This is a partial list of zoos in Japan. For aquaria, see List of aquaria in Japan.

Such facilities include zoos, safari parks, animal theme parks, aviaries, butterfly zoos, and reptile centers, as well as wildlife sanctuaries and nature reserves where visitors are allowed.

Aichi Prefecture
Higashiyama Zoo and Botanical Gardens, Nagoya
Japan Monkey Centre, Inuyama, Aichi
Okazaki Higashi Park Zoo, Okazaki, Aichi
Toyohashi Zoo & Botanical Park, Toyohashi, Aichi
Toyota City Kuragaike-Park, Toyota, Aichi

Akita Prefecture
Akita Omoriyama Zoo, Akita, Akita

Chiba Prefecture
Chiba Zoological Park, Chiba, Chiba
Ichihara Elephant Kingdom, Ichihara, Chiba
Ichikawa Zoological & Botanical Garden, Ichikawa, Chiba
Mother Farm, Futtsu, Chiba

Ehime Prefecture
Tobe Zool. Park of Ehime Prefecture, Iyo, Ehime

Fukui Prefecture
Sabae Nishiyama Park Zoo, Sabae, Fukui

Fukuoka Prefecture
Assuran Bird House, Onojo 
Fukuoka Municipal Zoo and Botanical Garden, Fukuoka
Itozu no Mori Zoological Park, Kitakyūshū
Kurume City Bird Center, Kurume, Fukuoka
Ōmuta Zoo, Ōmuta, Fukuoka
Uminonakamichi Seaside Park Zoological Garden, Fukuoka

Gunma Prefecture
Gunma Safari Park, Tomioka, Gunma
Kiryugaoka Zoo, Kiryu, Gunma

Hiroshima Prefecture
Fukuyama City Zoo, Fukuyama, Hiroshima
Hiroshima City Asa Zoological Park, Hiroshima

Hokkaidō
Asahiyama Zoo, Asahikawa, Hokkaidō
Kushiro Zoo, Kushiro, Hokkaidō
Noboribetsu Bear Park, Noboribetsu, Hokkaidō
Obihiro Zoo, Obihiro, Hokkaido
Sapporo Maruyama Zoo, Sapporo

Hyogo Prefecture
Awaji Farm Park England Hill, Minamiawaji, Hyōgo
Himeji Central Park, Himeji, Hyōgo
Himeji City Zoo, Himeji, Hyōgo
 Kobe Kachoen, Kobe
Oji Zoo, Kobe

Ibaraki Prefecture
Hitachi Kamine Zoological Garden, Hitachi, Ibaraki

Ishikawa Prefecture
Ishikawa Zoo, Nomi, Ishikawa

Iwate Prefecture
Morioka Zoological Park, Morioka, Iwate

Kagoshima Prefecture
Amami Islands Botanical Garden, Kagoshima
Hirakawa Zoological Park, Kagoshima

Kanagawa Prefecture
Kanazawa Zoological Gardens, Yokohama
Nogeyama Zoo, Yokohama
Odawara Zoo, Odawara, Kanagawa
Yokohama Zoo (Zoorasia), Yokohama
Yumemigasaki Zoological Park, Kawasaki, Kanagawa

Kōchi Prefecture
Noichi Zoological Park of Kōchi Prefecture, Komi District, Kōchi
Wanpark Kōchi Animal Land, Kōchi, Kōchi

Kumamoto Prefecture
Cuddly Dominion, Aso, Kumamoto
Kumamoto City Zoological and Botanical Gardens, Kumamoto, Kumamoto

Kyoto Prefecture
Kyoto Municipal Zoo, Kyoto

Miyagi Prefecture
Miyagi Zao Fox Village
Yagiyama Zoological Park, Sendai

Miyazaki Prefecture
Miyazaki City Phenix Zoo, Miyazaki, Miyazaki

Nagano Prefecture
Iida City Zoo, Iida, Nagano
Nagano Chausuyama Zoo, Nagano, Nagano
Omachi Alpine Museum, Omachi, Nagano
Suzaka Zoo, Suzaka, Nagano

Nagasaki Prefecture
Nagasaki Biopark, Saikai, Nagasaki
Sasebo Zoological Park and Botanical Garden, Sasebo, Nagasaki

Ōita Prefecture
Kyushu African Lion Safari, Usa, Ōita
Takasakiyama Natural Zoo, Ōita, Ōita

Okayama Prefecture
Ikeda Zoo, Okayama, Okayama
Great Ape Research institute, Hayashibara, Tamano, Okayama

Okinawa Prefecture
Neo Park Okinawa, Nago, Okinawa
Okinawa Kodomo Future Zone, Okinawa

Osaka Prefecture
Kashihara City Insectary Museum, Kashiwara, Osaka
Misaki Koen, Sennan, Osaka
Satsukiyama Zoo, Ikeda, Osaka
Tennoji Zoo, Osaka

Saitama Prefecture
Miyazawako Nakayoshi Zoo, Hannō, Saitama
Saitama Children's Zoo, Higashimatsuyama, Saitama
Saitama Omiya Park Zoo, Saitama, Saitama
Sayama Chikosan Park Children Zoo, Sayama, Saitama
Tobu Zoo, Minamisaitama District, Saitama

Shimane Prefecture
Matsue Vogel Park, Matsue, Shimane

Shizuoka Prefecture
Atagawa Tropical & Alligator Garden, Kamo District, Shizuoka
Fuji Safari Park, Susono, Shizuoka
Hamamatsu Municipal Zoo, Hamamatsu
iZoo, Kawazu, Shizuoka
Izu Biopark, Kamo District, Shizuoka
Izu Shaboten Zoo, Itō, Shizuoka
Mishima City Park Rakujuen, Mishima, Shizuoka
Shizuoka Municipal Nihondaira Zoo, Shizuoka, Shizuoka

Tochigi Prefecture
Nasu Animal Kingdom, Nasu, Tochigi
Utsunomiya Zoo, Utsunomiya, Tochigi

Tokushima Prefecture
Tokushima Municipal Zoo, Tokushima, Tokushima

Tokyo
Edogawa Ward Natural Zoo, Edogawa, Tokyo
Hamura Zoological Park, Hamura, Tokyo
Inogashira Park Zoo, Tokyo
Ōshima Park Zoo, Izu Ōshima
Tama Zoo, Tokyo
Ueno Zoo, Ueno, Tokyo

Toyama Prefecture
Takaoka Kojo Park Zoo, Takaoka, Toyama
Toyama Municipal Family Park Zoo, Toyama, Toyama

Wakayama Prefecture
Adventure World, Shirahama, Shirahama, Wakayama 
Wakayama Park Zoo, Wakayama, Wakayama

Yamaguchi Prefecture
Akiyoshidai Safari Land, Mine, Yamaguchi
Shunan Municipal Tokuyama Zoo, Shūnan, Yamaguchi
Ube Tokiwa Park, Ube, Yamaguchi

Yamanashi Prefecture
Kofu Yuki Park Zoo, Kofu, Yamanashi

See also

List of aquarium in Japan
List of botanical gardens in Japan
List of dolphinariums
List of fossil parks
List of national parks
List of tourist attractions worldwide
List of WAZA member zoos and aquariums
List of wildlife sanctuaries
List of zoos

References

Zoos
 
Japan
Zoos